The Eller College of Management (Eller) is a business school at the University of Arizona located in Tucson, Arizona. The Eller College of Management began in 1913 as bachelor's degree program in commerce before becoming the University of Arizona School of Business and Public Administration in 1944. In 1999, the school was renamed the Eller College of Management in honor of its primary benefactor Karl Eller, an entrepreneur and alumnus of the University of Arizona. It is one of the largest colleges at the University of Arizona, with over 5,400 undergraduate students and nearly 700 graduate students. 

Eller employs over 130 faculty members, and as of 2016 offers programs in Accounting, Economics, Finance, Marketing, Management Information Systems (MIS), Operations Management, Entrepreneurship, Business Administration and Management and Organizations. Its interdisciplinary program in Entrepreneurship has received high rankings. It is one of the first business schools in the U.S. to promote "social entrepreneurship and awareness" as part of the traditional business school curriculum.

Admissions into Eller's undergraduate program is selective. Approximately 60% of students are admitted every semester to the "professional cohort". 

Since May 2022, the dean is Karthik Kannan.

The Karl and Stevie Eller Professional Development Center opened in 2016.

Rankings
The most recent U.S. News & World Report ranks Eller 21st in undergraduate business programs in the U.S. (including public and private institutions), the highest ranking college at the University of Arizona. According to U.S. News, Eller also boast the #2 Public Management Information Systems and ranked #16 Entrepreneurship programs nationally. The MIS program has been ranked in the Top 5 by U.S. News since the inception of the rankings, one of only three programs in the U.S. with such a distinction. Eller's programs in Supply Chain Logistics and Accounting ranked top 20 and Marketing ranked in the nation's Top 25 by U.S. News as of 2008. The Department of Management and Organizations also ranked in the nation's top 25 by U.S. News as of 2010

In 2009, the Financial Times ranked Eller's MBA program 5th among U.S. public universities, 19th among all U.S. universities and 41st worldwide in its global rankings. The Entrepreneurship program was ranked 3rd worldwide in the Financial Times.

In 2005, Eller's MBA program was ranked in the Top 25 regional programs by recruiters in a poll conducted by The Wall Street Journal. U.S. News & World Report has ranked the MBA program among the Top 50 programs nationally for 12 consecutive years. Forbes magazine ranked the Eller MBA program 33rd overall for having the best return on investment (ROI), in its fourth biennial rankings of business schools 2005. The MBA program was also ranked 24th by The Wall Street Journals 2005 Interactive Regional Ranking.

Notable alumni
 Karl Eller – Arizona business leader and nationally recognized entrepreneur, was inducted into the Advertising Hall of Fame by the American Advertising Federation in March 2004 in New York City. Eller is also the namesake of the Eller College of Management.
 Jim Furyk – professional golfer
 Terry Lundgren – CEO/Chairman of the Board/President/Director at Federated Department Stores, Inc., the parent company of Macy's and Bloomingdale's department stores
 Arturo Moreno – Owner of the Los Angeles Angels of Anaheim Major League Baseball team, outdoor advertising entrepreneur
 Robert Sarver – Managing Partner, Majority Owner of the Phoenix Suns basketball team. Director, SkyWest Airlines and Meritage Corporation.
 Thomas Kalinske – former President, Knowledge Universe; former Chairman, LeapFrog Enterprises

See also
 Economic and Business Research Center
 List of United States business school rankings
 List of business schools in the United States

References

University of Arizona
Business schools in Arizona
Educational institutions established in 1913
1913 establishments in Arizona